Prince Philip, Duke of Edinburgh (10 June 1921 – 9 April 2021), received numerous titles, decorations and honorary appointments, both before and during his time as consort to Queen Elizabeth II. Each is listed below. Where two dates are shown, the first indicates the date of receiving the title or award (the title as Prince Philip of Greece and Denmark being given as from his birth) and the second indicates the date of its loss, renunciation or when its use was discontinued.

Royal and noble titles and styles

 10 June 192128 February 1947: His Royal Highness Prince Philip of Greece and Denmark
 28 February 194719 November 1947: Lieutenant Philip Mountbatten
 19 November 194720 November 1947: Lieutenant His Royal Highness Sir Philip Mountbatten
 20 November 194722 February 1957: His Royal Highness The Duke of Edinburgh
 22 February 19579 April 2021: His Royal Highness The Prince Philip, Duke of Edinburgh

Full style
His British honours were read out at his funeral, held in the United Kingdom, by Thomas Woodcock, Garter Principal King of Arms, as follows:

Royal styles and titles 1947
On 19 November 1947, the day preceding his wedding, King George VI bestowed by Letters Patent the style His Royal Highness on Philip and, on the morning of the wedding, 20 November 1947, further Letters Patent created him Duke of Edinburgh, Earl of Merioneth, and Baron Greenwich of Greenwich in the County of London.  Consequently, already being a Knight of the Garter, between 19 and 20 November 1947, he bore the unusual style His Royal Highness Sir Philip Mountbatten and is so described in the Letters Patent of 20 November 1947.

Unofficial

 19522021 :
In Tok Pisin: Oldfella Pili-Pili him bilong Misis Kwin

, Vanuatu
 19522021 :
In Pidgin English: Number one big fella him bilong Misis Kwin

 Posthumously (11 April 2021) : Grandfather of the nation

 5 August 19609 April 2021 : Bard Philip Meirionnydd

Debate over Prince Philip's titles and honours

Royal title 
On the popular, but erroneous, assumption that if Philip had the style of His Royal Highness he was automatically a British Prince, media reports after his marriage to Princess Elizabeth referred to a Prince Philip, with or without reference to any ducal title. This may have been influenced by the fact that he had actually been a Prince of Greece and Denmark by birth, the use of which titles he had discontinued already. Although the princely title was omitted in the British Regency Act 1953, and in Letters Patent of November 1953 appointing Counsellors of State, it had been included in Letters Patent of 22 October 1948 conferring princely rank on children from Philip's marriage to Elizabeth. King George VI, however, is believed to have been clear and intentional in having withheld the title of Prince from his future son-in-law.

On 3 February 1953, John Diefenbaker MP expressed to the House of Commons of Canada his desire to see Philip bear a title that alluded to the Queen's pan-national position and put forward the suggestion of Prince of the Commonwealth. In May of the following year, U.K. Prime Minister Winston Churchill received a written suggestion from the Queen that her husband be granted the title that Diefenbaker had mentioned, or some other suitable augmentation of his style. Churchill preferred the title Prince Consort, but the Foreign Secretary, Anthony Eden, expressed a preference for Prince of the Realm. While the Commonwealth Prime Ministers were assembled in London, Churchill was requested by the Queen to informally solicit their opinions on the matter of the Queen's husband's title. Canadian Prime Minister Louis St. Laurent was the only one to express "misgivings", while Philip insisted to the Queen that he objected to any enhancement of his title. The Queen thereafter contacted Churchill and told him to drop the matter. In 1955, the South African Prime Minister J. G. Strijdom belatedly made it known that the South African Cabinet objected to the title Prince of the Commonwealth. When told, the Queen continued to express the wish that her husband's position be raised, but rejected the British Cabinet's recommendations of Prince Consort or Prince Royal. The British Cabinet then suggested simply His Royal Highness the Prince, but the Queen was advised that if she still preferred Prince of the Commonwealth, her Private Secretary could write directly to the Commonwealth Governors-General for their response, though warning that if their consent was not unanimous the proposal could not go forward.

The matter appeared left until the publication on 8 February 1957 of an article by P. Wykeham-Bourne in The Evening Standard titled: "Well, is it correct to say Prince Philip?" A few days following, Prime Minister Harold Macmillan reversed the advice of the Queen's previous ministers and formally recommended that the Queen reject the Prince in favour of Prince of the United Kingdom of Great Britain and Northern Ireland, deleting the reference to the Commonwealth countries. Letters Patent were issued on 22 February 1957 giving the Duke the style and titular dignity of a Prince of the United Kingdom of Great Britain and Northern Ireland (omitting the wording and Her other Realms and Territories). According to the announcement in the London Gazette, he should henceforth be known as His Royal Highness The Prince Philip, Duke of Edinburgh, with the capitalised definite article normally restricted to the children of monarchs.

The media cultivated speculation in early 2007 that the title of Prince Consort might be conferred to mark the royal couple's 60th wedding anniversary in November that year; however, this did not occur.

Order of Australia

Prince Philip's elevation on Australia Day 2015 from Companion to Knight of the Order of Australia caused some political controversy in Australia. Prime Minister Tony Abbott's recommendation (via Sir Peter Cosgrove) to the Queen to confer the honour was criticised by the Labor opposition leader, Bill Shorten, among others. While conservative ministers and editorials supported his award of an honour, Abbott himself later admitted to a lapse of judgement, saying the appointment was ‘injudicious’.

Naval ranks and appointments
 19401941: Midshipman, HMS Ramillies, HMS Valiant
 194116 July 1942: Sub-Lieutenant, HMS Wallace
 16 July 1942October 1942: Lieutenant, HMS Wallace
 October 194215 August 1950: First Lieutenant, HMS Wallace, HMS Whelp, HMS Chequers
 15 August 19502 February 1952: Lieutenant Commander, HMS Chequers, HMS Magpie
 2 February 195215 January 1953: Commander, HMS Magpie
 15 January 19539 April 2021: Admiral of the Fleet, RN
 10 June 20119 April 2021: Lord High Admiral of the United Kingdom

Commonwealth honours

Commonwealth realms

Appointments

Decorations and medals

Other Commonwealth countries
Appointments

Decorations

Foreign honours 
 Orders

Decorations

Wear of orders, decorations, and medals
Awards that were worn regularly by Prince Philip are noted in the above tables and were worn in accordance with customary British conventions applicable to the occasion, the location and to the form of dress worn. Awards not specifically noted were worn by Prince Philip on appropriate occasions relating to the country that made the award, again in accordance with UK conventions. The ribbons worn by Prince Philip at the time of his death were as follows:

Notes on wear

Honorary military positions
 Australia
  19542021: Admiral of the Fleet of the Royal Australian Navy
  19542021: Field Marshal of the Australian Army
  19592021: Colonel-in-Chief of the Royal Australian Electrical and Mechanical Engineers
  19632021: Colonel-in-Chief of the Australian Army Cadets
  19542021: Marshal of the Royal Australian Air Force

 Canada

  19532021: Admiral of the Royal Canadian Sea Cadets
  20112021: Admiral of the Royal Canadian Navy
  19532021: Colonel-in-Chief of the Royal Canadian Army Cadets
  8 December 19539 April 2021: Colonel-in-Chief of the Royal Canadian Regiment
  19672021: Colonel-in-Chief of the Seaforth Highlanders of Canada
  19672021: Colonel-in-Chief of the Queen's Own Cameron Highlanders of Canada
  19672021: Colonel-in-Chief of the Cameron Highlanders of Ottawa (Duke of Edinburgh's Own)
  15 July 19789 April 2021: Colonel-in-Chief of the Royal Hamilton Light Infantry (Wentworth Regiment)
  20112021: Captain-General of the Canadian Army
  19532021: Air Commodore-in-Chief of the Royal Canadian Air Cadets
  20112021: General of the Royal Canadian Air Force

 New Zealand
  19582021: Admiral of the Fleet of the Royal New Zealand Navy
  19541964: Colonel-in-Chief of the Hawke's Bay Regiment
  19541964: Colonel-in-Chief of the Otago and Southland Regiment
  19702021: Colonel-in-Chief of the Royal New Zealand Electrical and Mechanical Engineers
  19772021: Field Marshal of the New Zealand Army
  19772021: Marshal of the Royal New Zealand Air Force

  Trinidad and Tobago
  19642021: Honorary Colonel of the Trinidad and Tobago Regiment

 United Kingdom
  19532021: Admiral of the Fleet of the Royal Navy
  19521992: Admiral of the Sea Cadet Corps
  19532017: Captain General Royal Marines
  20112021: Lord High Admiral of the United Kingdom
  19532021: Field Marshal of the British Army
  19522021: Colonel-in-Chief Army Cadet Force
  19531958: Colonel-in-Chief of the 8th King's Royal Irish Hussars
  19531959: Colonel-in-Chief of the Wiltshire Regiment
  19531961: Colonel-in-Chief of the Queen's Own Cameron Highlanders
  19531957: Honorary Colonel of the Leicestershire Yeomanry
  19532021: Honorary Colonel of the City of Edinburgh University Officers' Training Corps
  19531974: Colonel of the Welsh Guards
  19572021: Honorary Colonel of the Leicestershire and Derbyshire Yeomanry
  19572021: Member Honourable Artillery Company
  19581993: Colonel-in-Chief of the Queen's Royal Irish Hussars
  19591994: Colonel-in-Chief of the Duke of Edinburgh's Royal Regiment
  19611994: Colonel-in-Chief of the Queen's Own Highlanders (Seaforth and Camerons)
  19692021: Colonel-in-Chief of the Corps of Royal Electrical and Mechanical Engineers
  19752017: Colonel of the Grenadier Guards
  19772021: Colonel-in-Chief of the Intelligence Corps
  19932002: Deputy Colonel-in-Chief of the Queen's Royal Hussars
  19942007 Colonel-in-Chief of the Royal Gloucestershire, Berkshire and Wiltshire Regiment
  19942006: Colonel-in-Chief of the Highlanders (Seaforth, Gordons and Camerons)
  20022021: Colonel-in-Chief of the Queen's Royal Hussars
  20062021: Royal Colonel of the Highlanders, 4th Battalion, The Royal Regiment of Scotland
  20072020: Colonel-in-Chief of the Rifles
  19532021: Marshal of the Royal Air Force
  19522015: Air Commodore-in-Chief of the Air Training Corps
  19522015: Honorary Air Commodore-in-Chief of the Royal Air Force Air Cadets
  19531957: Honorary Air Commodore of the No. 601 (County of London) Squadron
  19772012: Honorary Air Commodore of RAF Kinloss
  19832021: Air-Commodore of the University Air Squadron

Non-national titles and honours

Citizenship
  1962: Montevideo
  16 March 1966: Chicago

Municipal Awards
  1968: Grand Commander of the Order of Maritime Merit of the San Francisco Port Authority

City freedoms
Commonwealth realms
  14 June 1948: London - Liveryman of the Worshipful Company of Fishmongers
  1948: Greenwich
  1949: Edinburgh
  May 1949: Belfast
  1 December 1954: Cardiff
  15 February 1955: Glasgow
  3 December 1956: Melbourne
  1959: Calgary
  1964: Bridgetown
  1995: Windsor and Maidenhead
  6 July 2012: Perth

Other Commonwealth
  1961: Dar es Salaam
  1963: Nairobi

Foreign
  1964: Guadalajara
  1964: Acapulco
  1966: Los Angeles

Other
Deputy Sheriff of Harris County, Texas
Honorary Deputy Sheriff of Los Angeles County

Memberships and Fellowships

Scholastic
 Chancellor, visitor, governor, and fellowships

Honorary degrees

Honorific eponyms

Awards
  The Duke of Edinburgh's Award
 : Prince Philip Designers Prize
 : Prince Philip Medal

Geographic locations
 : Prince Philip Glacier

Structures

Buildings
 : Prince Philip Hospital
 : Prince Philip Dental Hospital

Highways, roads, and bridges
 : Prince Philip Drive, London.
 : Prince Philip Drive, St. John's.
 : Prince Philip Drive.

Parks
  
: Prince Philip Park

See also
 Duke of Edinburgh
 List of titles and honours of Elizabeth II
 List of titles and honours of Charles III
 List of titles and honours of Queen Camilla
 List of titles and honours of William, Prince of Wales
 List of titles and honours of Anne, Princess Royal
 List of titles and honours of George VI
 List of titles and honours of Queen Elizabeth The Queen Mother
 List of titles and honours of Mary of Teck
 List of titles and honours of Prince Arthur, Duke of Connaught and Strathearn
 List of honours of the British royal family by country

Notes

References

External links
 Heraldica archive of correspondence regarding the Duke of Edinburgh's title

Titles and Honours
Lists of titles by person of the United Kingdom
British monarchy-related lists
Edinburgh-related lists
Knights of the Garter
Knights of the Thistle
Knights Grand Cross of the Royal Victorian Order
Recipients of the Order of Saints George and Constantine
Grand Crosses of the Order of George I
Recipients of the Order of the Phoenix (Greece)
Grand Crosses of the Order of Saint-Charles
Order of Saint Olav
Bearers of the Leopold Order
Order of the White Rose of Finland
Recipients of the Order of the Netherlands Lion
Recipients of the Order of the Tower and Sword
Grand Crosses of the Order of Christ (Portugal)
Grand Crosses of the Order of Aviz
Grand Croix of the Légion d'honneur
Grand Cordons of the Order of Merit of the Republic of Poland
Knights Grand Cross of the Order of Merit of the Italian Republic
Grand Crosses Special Class of the Order of Merit of the Federal Republic of Germany
Grand Crosses with Diamonds of the Order of the Sun of Peru
Grand Crosses of the Order of the Liberator General San Martin
Knights Grand Cross of the Order of the Falcon
Recipients of orders, decorations, and medals of Sudan